Princess Katarina of Yugoslavia, Lady de Silva (born 28 November 1959) is an English businessperson specialising in etiquette and decorum courses. She is a member of the extended former Yugoslavian royal family.

Early life
Katarina was born in London to Princess Margarita of Baden and Prince Tomislav of Yugoslavia. Her father's dynasty having been deposed and banished from Yugoslavia after World War II, she grew up in exile, largely in England. She has one brother, Prince Nikola of Yugoslavia, and two half-brothers, Prince George and Prince Michael. She is a first cousin of Alexander, Crown Prince of Yugoslavia. Her grandmother, Princess Theodora, Margravine of Baden, was the sister of Prince Philip, Duke of Edinburgh, late husband of Queen Elizabeth II. Princess Katharina is the senior female-line descendant of Queen Victoria, through the Queen's second daughter Princess Alice, who was the grandmother of Princess Katharina's great grandmother, Princess Alice of Battenberg.

Career
In 1978, Katarina was presented as a debutante to high society at the International Debutante Ball at the Waldorf-Astoria Hotel. , Katarina and former Royal butler Grant Harrold develop and sell etiquette and decorum classes. In 2014, she became an ambassador for the Chinese tea company Yunnan Dianhong Group.

Personal life 
Katarina married barrister Sir Desmond de Silva on 5 December 1987. They had one daughter, Victoria Marie Esmé Margarita, born on 6 September 1991. They divorced on 6 May 2010.

Charity work 
In 2009, Katarina supported the charity Project Change: Bermuda to raise funds towards building a hospital and training medical staff in Burundi. Katarina served as the president of the Guild of Travel and Tourism in the United Kingdom. She was a royal patron of the Queen Charlotte's Ball. In 2013, she became patron of the Society of Genealogists succeeding Prince Michael of Kent. In 2015, she became a trustee of the Katie Cutler Foundation, a charity in support of attack victim Alan Barnes.

Honours
  House of Karađorđević: Dame Grand Cordon of the Royal Order of St. Sava
  House of Bourbon-Two Sicilies: Dames Grand Cross Royal Order of Francis I

Ancestry
Katarina is a member of the House of Karađorđević. Through her father, Katarina descends from kings Nicholas I of Montenegro, Ferdinand I of Romania, and furthermore from Emperor Nicholas I of Russia, King Ferdinand II and Queen Maria II of Portugal, and Queen Victoria of the United Kingdom of Great Britain and Ireland.

Through her mother, Katarina descends from Leopold, Grand Duke of Baden, kings George V of Hanover, Christian IX of Denmark, George I and Alexander of Greece, and Tsar Nicholas I of Russia.

References

External links 
 

1959 births
Living people
Katarina
British debutantes
Debutantes of the International Debutante Ball
Recipients of the Order of St. Sava
Wives of knights
20th-century British businesswomen
21st-century British businesspeople
Businesspeople from London
British people of Yugoslav descent
English people of German descent
Philanthropists from London
English women philanthropists
De Silva family